Roman Dmitriyevich Simonov (born 9 August 2001) is a Russian football player. He plays for FC Amkar Perm.

Club career
He made his debut in the Russian Football National League for FC Krasnodar-2 on 4 October 2020 in a game against FC Nizhny Novgorod.

References

External links
 Profile by Russian Football National League
 

2001 births
Living people
Russian footballers
Association football forwards
FC Krasnodar-2 players
FC Zenit-Izhevsk players
FC Amkar Perm players
Russian First League players
Russian Second League players